Cerionesta is a genus of jumping spiders that was first described by Eugène Louis Simon in 1901.  it contains only two species, found only on the Windward Islands and the Galápagos Islands: C. luteola and C. pacifica.

References

Salticidae genera
Salticidae
Spiders of the Caribbean